Marta de Souza Sobral (born 23 March 1964 in São Paulo) is a former Brazilian female basketball player. Sobral, while a member of the Brazil women's national basketball team, participated in three Summer Olympics (1992, 1996, 2000), and won a medal in two of them (1996 and 2000). She is the sister of fellow Brazilian basketball Olympian Leila Sobral.

References

1964 births
Living people
Basketball players from São Paulo
Brazilian women's basketball players
Basketball players at the 1992 Summer Olympics
Basketball players at the 1996 Summer Olympics
Basketball players at the 2000 Summer Olympics
Olympic basketball players of Brazil
Olympic bronze medalists for Brazil
Olympic silver medalists for Brazil
Olympic medalists in basketball
Medalists at the 2000 Summer Olympics
Medalists at the 1996 Summer Olympics